National Airlines was a major United States airline that operated from 1934 to 1980. For most of its existence the company was headquartered at Miami International Airport, Florida. At its height, National Airlines had a network of "Coast-to-Coast-to-Coast" flights, linking  Florida and the Gulf Coast such as New Orleans and Houston with cities along the East Coast as far north as Boston as well as with large cities on the West Coast including Los Angeles, San Francisco and Seattle. From 1970 to 1978, National, Braniff International Airways, Pan American World Airways (Pan Am) and Trans World Airlines (TWA) were the only U.S. airlines that were permitted to operate scheduled passenger flights to Europe.

History

1930s
National Airlines was founded by George T. Baker (1899–1963) in 1934. Its headquarters were in St. Petersburg, Florida and it was based at the city's Albert Whitted Airport. On October 15 of that year, revenue flights were launched, transporting passengers and mail from St. Petersburg to a few destinations within Florida using a fleet of two Ryan ST monoplanes. In 1935, the Stinson Trimotor was introduced with National Airlines, which were soon replaced by the Lockheed Model 10 Electra. In 1939, the company headquarters were moved to Jacksonville. By the end of the decade, the National Airlines network spanned from Miami to New Orleans, on what it called the Buccaneer Route.

1940s

Revenue passenger miles for years ending June 30:
 1936: 249,799
 1938: 653,688
 1939: 1,340,050
 1940: 3,465,316
 1941: 7,264,322
 1946: 108,760,267

In 1940 the Lockheed Model 18 Lodestar became the backbone of National's fleet. National was awarded rights from Florida to New York City and other cities along the East Coast in 1944, with flights starting in 1945. In 1946 National got approval to fly to Havana, Cuba, which coincided with the introduction of the Douglas DC-4. The DC-4 allowed non-stop flights between Miami and New York that started on February 14, 1946. Later that year National relocated its headquarters to Miami International Airport; a maintenance base opened at Miami in 1950.

The Douglas DC-6, National's first pressurized airliner, began flights on July 1, 1947 and reduced New York to Miami flight time from five to four hours. Flights on the DC-6 were marketed as Star Service. National ran the Piggy Bank Vacations campaign, promoting low-fare flights to Florida during the off-peak summer season.

1950s

This decade saw the introduction of the Convair 340/440, the Douglas DC-7, and the Lockheed L-1049 Super Constellation. On December 10, 1958, National became the first airline to operate domestic jet flights, using a Boeing 707 leased from Pan American World Airways between Miami and New York. In 1959 the Lockheed L-188 Electra was introduced into the fleet. It was the only turboprop aircraft type ever operated by the airline. At the end of the decade Houston and Boston were the ends of the network with heavy emphasis on service between Florida and the U.S. East Coast and Gulf Coast.

1960s
With the award of traffic rights on the southern transcontinental route on March 11, 1961, National Airlines gained access to California and began operating new Douglas DC-8s between Florida and Los Angeles and San Francisco with a number of flights stopping in Houston and/or New Orleans (previously, American Airlines, Delta Air Lines and National had together operated Douglas DC-6s and DC-7s  through between  Miami and California). In March 1962, National scheduled one round trip transcontinental nonstop:  National flights 34 and 35 between Miami and Los Angeles on DC-8s. Concerning international destinations in Central and South America, a cooperation involving interchange flights with Pan Am was set up.

In the early 1960s National started new service with the Lockheed Electra propjet to Las Vegas and San Diego. Eastbound coast to coast routes flown with the Electra included San Diego-Los Angeles-Houston-New Orleans-Miami and San Francisco-Las Vegas-Houston-New Orleans-Tampa-Orlando-Jacksonville.  National had other long, multistop routings with the Electra such as Boston-New York City-Jacksonville-Orlando-Tampa-New Orleans-Houston-Las Vegas-San Francisco.  National flight 223 departed Boston at 7:30am and arrived in San Francisco at 8:42pm.

In 1962 Louis Bergman "Bud" Maytag, Jr. (grandson of Maytag Corporation founder Frederick Louis Maytag I), who had previously led Frontier Airlines bought a majority share in National Airlines and replaced George T. Baker as CEO. In 1960 the airline modernized its fleet with new Douglas DC-8s, followed by ten new Boeing 727-100 trijets, the first of which was delivered in 1964.

After the retirement of the Electras in 1968, National became an all-jet airline with the DC-8 and 727. The airline introduced the first jet service into Key West, FL in 1968 with the Boeing 727-100.  The Douglas DC-8 fleet included the stretched Super DC-8-61 which was the largest aircraft type operated by the airline until the introduction of new wide body jetliners such as the Boeing 747 and McDonnell Douglas DC-10.  In 1969 National flew the Super DC-8 nonstop between Miami and New York JFK airport and nonstop between Miami and Los Angeles, flights having names such as "The Royal Biscayne", "The Royal Dolphin", "The Gotham" and "The Manhattan" between Miami and New York, and "The Californian" and "The Caribbean" between Miami and Los Angeles.

On July 26, 1969, the Atlanta-San Francisco nonstop route was awarded to National and service began on October 1, 1969. It was National's only route out of Atlanta.

1970s

A $17 million IBM electronic computer reservation system, called Res-A-Vision, was completed and put into operation in 1970.

On June 16, 1970, National Airlines reintroduced international flights, when their Miami-London route opened (flights to Cuba were suspended in 1961 due to the Cuban Revolution). With the London route, they became the third U.S. transatlantic passenger carrier, after Pan Am and TWA.

In the fall of 1970, the Boeing 747-100 jumbo jet, at that time the largest commercial airliner, entered service with National on the Miami-New York nonstop route on October 1, 1970, and the Miami-Los Angeles transcontinental nonstop route on October 25, 1970. National sold its 747s in May 1976. Also in 1970, National Airlines opened their own terminal at John F. Kennedy International Airport, which was dubbed the Sundrome.

Having placed an order for ten aircraft back in 1969, the wide body McDonnell Douglas DC-10-10 was put in service on the Miami-New York route on December 15, 1971. A 1971 publicity campaign designed by F. William Free promoting National's flight attendants was criticized by the National Organization for Women as being sexist due to the slogan "I'm (flight attendant's name). Fly me.", or similar. Seeing one of these posters in Manchester inspired Eric Stewart of 10cc to write the band's 1976 hit song "I'm Mandy Fly Me".

In May 1973, the front cover of the airline's system timetable proudly proclaimed, "National has daily nonstop 747s from Miami to London".  By early 1976, the airline was operating scheduled wide body DC-10 service to Houston (IAH), Las Vegas (LAS), Los Angeles (LAX), Miami (MIA), New Orleans (MSY), Orlando (MCO), San Diego (SAN), San Francisco (SFO), Tampa (TPA), West Palm Beach (PBI) and all three airports in the New York City area:  John F. Kennedy (JFK), LaGuardia (LGA) and Newark (EWR).  With the advent of the intercontinental McDonnell Douglas DC-10-30, National Airlines then expanded their European network by adding Paris (inaugurated on June 22, 1977), as well as Frankfurt, Amsterdam (both in 1978) and Zurich (in 1979). National began the very first nonstop flights from New Orleans to Europe (to Amsterdam) on July 2, 1978.  National then began nonstop New York Kennedy (JFK)-Amsterdam flights on December 13, 1978, taking the route over from Pan Am.

In 1975, National was forced to shut down for several months due to a strike by flight attendants.

In the late 1970s, several airlines attempted to take over National Airlines, which had become a major player in the southern transcontinental and Florida-East Coast airline markets. In 1978, Texas International Airlines (which was led by Frank Lorenzo at that time) acquired 24.6 percent of the shares, but did not succeed in the subsequent tender offer takeover bid. A similar attempt was made by Eastern Air Lines in 1979. At the same time, the shares held by Texas International were sold to Pan American World Airways, who emerged as a white knight and succeeded in accumulating a controlling majority.

Acquisition by Pan Am

On January 7, 1980, the acquisition of National was completed, with Pan Am taking over the National Airlines fleet and route network. Pan Am continued to utilize the former National Miami maintenance base and headquarters building until Pan Am itself ceased operations in December 1991.  Much later, National's "Sun King" logo was sold and "repackaged" much like Pan Am's to appear upon the branding of start up "low cost carrier" Southeast Airlines aircraft.

Most industry analysts believe that Pan Am paid too high a price for National, and was ill-prepared to integrate National's domestic route network with Pan Am's own globe-girdling international network. The cultures of National and Pan Am also proved to be incompatible, making workforce integration difficult. Texas International walked away from their foiled attempt with a multi-million dollar stock profit and was poised for Lorenzo's next ventures—a startup airline in the high-density East Coast corridor (New York Air), and subsequent acquisition of Continental Airlines.

Route network

National Airlines operated scheduled flights to the following U.S. cities:

National also operated scheduled flights to the following destinations in Europe and the Caribbean:

Fleet

When National Airlines was acquired by Pan Am in 1980, the fleet consisted of 43 Boeing 727 aircraft (19 of the original series 100 model and 24 of the stretched series 200 variant), as well as 16 McDonnell Douglas DC-10 airliners (11 of the series 10 model used in domestic service and five of the intercontinental series 30 model used for service to Europe).

Over the years, National owned the following aircraft types:

Sun King Club

Domestic
 Fort Lauderdale
 Houston
 Miami
 Jacksonville
 Los Angeles
 New Orleans
 New York (Kennedy)
 New York (LaGuardia)
 Newark
 Orlando
 San Francisco
 Tampa
 Washington (National)
 West Palm Beach

International
 Amsterdam
 Frankfurt
 London (Heathrow)
 Paris (Orly)

Accidents and incidents

Fatal
On October 5, 1945 National Airlines Flight 16, a Lockheed Model 18 Lodestar (registered NC18199) crashed into a lake near Lakeland, Florida at 01:05 local time. The scheduled passenger flight had originated in Tampa, when the pilots encountered technical problems during approach of Lakeland Airport, which led to a failed go-around attempt. Of the 15 people on board, two passengers died.
On January 14, 1951, 6 of the 28 passengers on board Flight 83 died when the aircraft, a Douglas DC-4 (registered N74685) overshot the runway and crashed into a ditch at Philadelphia International Airport. The pilots of the flight from New York City had tried to land the aircraft too far down the runway, instead of aborting the approach. Frankie Housley, the only stewardess, also died. She has been regarded as a hero, as she had returned to the burning wreckage to lead passengers to safety.
On February 11, 1952, Flight 101, a Douglas DC-6, crashed shortly after take-off from Newark Airport due to a failure of a propeller and subsequent loss of control. Of the 59 passengers on board, 26 died, as well as three of the four crew members. Four people on the ground were killed.
With 46 fatalities (5 crew and 41 passengers, among them Billy DeBeck's widow), the disaster of Flight 470 on February 14, 1953 marks the worst accident in the history of National Airlines.
On November 16, 1959 at 00:55 local time, a Douglas DC-7 (registered N4891C) crashed into the Gulf of Mexico, the cause of which could not be determined.
On January 6, 1960, a bomb exploded aboard the DC-6 registered N8225H Flight 2511 en route from New York to Miami. In the subsequent crash near Bolivia, North Carolina, all 29 passengers and five crew died.
On November 3, 1973, a McDonnell Douglas DC-10 (registered N60NA) suffered an uncontained engine failure over Datil, New Mexico while operating as  Flight 27 from Houston to Las Vegas. Pieces of the turbine penetrated the fuselage, breaking a window in the passenger cabin and causing subsequent decompression. One passenger was sucked out of the aircraft and died. The flight made a successful emergency landing at Albuquerque.

Of the 52 passengers aboard the Boeing 727 registered N4744, three died. The pilots had attempted to land the aircraft at Pensacola International Airport.

Non-fatal
On September 13, 1945, a National Airlines Lockheed Lodestar (registered NC33349) overshot the runway at Peter O. Knight Airport near Tampa in rainy weather and came to a rest in the water of Hillsborough Bay. There were eleven passengers and three crew members on board the scheduled flight from Miami.
On October 11, 1945, another Lodestar (NC15555) was involved in a hull-loss accident. The pilots of Flight 23 from Jacksonville to Miami with 14 passengers aboard experienced an engine fire and attempted an emergency landing at Melbourne Airport. The approach was missed, but the pilots did not manage to pull the aircraft up, so it impacted the ground.
On October 2, 1950, a cargo-configured Curtiss C-46 Commando (registered N1661M) was substantially damaged in a belly landing at Washington National Airport.
On January 10, 1955, at 09:38, Flight 1 with ten passengers and three crew veered off the runway during a takeoff attempt at St. Petersburg-Clearwater Airport. The copilot had lost control of the Lockheed Lodestar (registered N33369) that had been bound for Sarasota.
On November 15, 1961, at 17:10, National Airlines Flight 429 (a DC-6 registered N8228H) collided with Northeast Airlines Flight 120 (a Vickers Viscount) on the ground at Logan International Airport in Boston. The pilots of the National aircraft with 25 passengers aboard had commenced with the takeoff run without having been cleared to do so, hitting the landing Northeast plane.

Hijackings
Between 1961 and 1980, 22 (attempted) hijackings on board National Airlines occurred, which involved the aircraft being demanded to be flown to Cuba. In 1969 alone, there were nine such occurrences. These events can be partly attributed to the tense Cuba–United States relations at that time, and the many flights of National Airlines in and to the southeastern United States, near Cuba. See List of Cuba – United States aircraft hijackings for more information.

There were several other criminal acts involving National Airlines aircraft:
On March 8, 1971, a hijacker on board Flight 745, a Boeing 727 with 46 occupants en route from Mobile to New Orleans, demanded the aircraft be flown to Canada instead.
On July 12, 1972, Michael Stanley Green and Ethiopian national Lulseged Tesfa hijacked National Airlines Flight 496 (a Boeing 727) while en route to New York from Philadelphia.
On March 30, 1974, following a hostage taking in Sarasota, the perpetrator tried to hijack a parked National Airlines 727 at Sarasota-Brandenton Airport, but was prevented from doing so by a flight engineer. A similar hijacking attempt happened on January 3, 1975, at Pensacola Airport.

See also 
 List of defunct airlines of the United States
 WPST-TV, a defunct television station in Miami, Florida, owned and operated by the airline from 1957 to 1961

References

Bibliography

Airlines established in 1934
Airlines disestablished in 1980
Pan Am
Companies based in Miami-Dade County, Florida
Defunct airlines of the United States
 
Defunct companies based in Florida
1980 mergers and acquisitions
1934 establishments in Florida
1980 disestablishments in Florida